

Manipur River, also called Kathe Khyoung (ကသည်းချောင်း), is a river in India's Manipur state that flows into Myanmar, where it merges with the Myittha River, a tributary of the Chindwin river.

Tributaries 
Imphal River
Iril River
Thoubal River
Khuga River
Tuitha River

See also
List of rivers of Burma

References 

Rivers of Myanmar
Rivers of Manipur
Rivers of India